Hassan Niknafs is an Iranian Azerbaijani mechanical engineer and academic administrator. He became president of Khazar University in 2015. Niknafs was dean of the school of engineering and applied sciences at Khazar University from 2013 to 2015.

Education 
Niknafs completed a BSc in chemical engineering at Pahlavi University in 1976. He earned a MSc in mechanical engineering at the Youngstown State University in 1979. Niknafs completed a Ph.D. in mechanical engineering at the University of Akron in 1994.

Career 
From 1979 to 1985, he was a project engineer for National Iranian Oil Company. In 1986–1988, he worked as a teaching assistant at Mechanical Engineering Department at the University of Akron. Then in 1988 he became a research and development engineer for Saint-Gobain NorPro Corporation, previously known as the Norton Chemical Process Products Corporation in Stow, OH. From 2001 to 2012, he taught applied math courses at the University of Akron. Then he became dean of the School of Engineering and Applied Sciences at Khazar University. In 2015, he was appointed president of Khazar University.

Personal life 
Niknafs' native language is Persian and his mother tongue is Azerbaijani. He is fluent in English.

References

Heads of universities and colleges in Azerbaijan
Academic staff of Khazar University
Living people
Shiraz University alumni
Youngstown State University alumni
University of Akron alumni
Year of birth missing (living people)
Azerbaijani mechanical engineers
Iranian mechanical engineers
Iranian academic administrators
21st-century Iranian engineers